Nashira (AK-85) was planned as a civilian cargo ship for the United States Maritime Commission, transferred to the Navy for construction then transferred to the U.S. Army and renamed two days after launching. The ship was never commissioned, thus never bore the USS designation, and had no significant naval service.  The ship was converted to the U.S. Army Engineer Port Repair ship Richard R. Arnold and served in the Pacific during 1945.

Construction and launch
Nashira (AK-85), named after Nashira, the third-brightest star in the constellation Capricorn, was a Maritime Commission type N3-M-A1 cargo vessel originally assigned the name Josiah Paul. The ship was transferred from the control of the Maritime Commission to the U.S. Navy 1 January 1943, prior to the start of construction.

Renamed Nashira 30 October 1943, she was laid down by Penn-Jersey Shipbuilding Corp., Camden, New Jersey, 1 November 1943; launched 23 April 1944; sponsored by Miss Patricia Palmer; delivered to the Navy 25 April 1944; and transferred to the U.S. Army the same day for use as a U.S. Army Port Repair ship. Nashira was struck from the Navy List 9 June 1944.

Army Port Repair Ship
The Army renamed the ship Richard R. Arnold after an Engineer officer, Colonel Richard R. Arnold, on General Eisenhower's personal staff killed by a mine 6 June 1943 in North Africa while commanding the 20th Engineer Regiment. The ship and its crew served as part of the Army Corps of Engineers (1070th Engineer Service Detachment) in the Pacific during 1945, participated in the Battle of Luzon (Philippines), crossed the equator four times, was present in Japan after the war, and returned to San Francisco on 24 December 1945.

Disposal
Richard R. Arnold was turned in to the Maritime Commission for disposal 17 July 1947 and placed in the Suisun Bay Reserve Fleet where it remained until sold for $31,151 on 4 March 1965 to Kelbar, Inc. for scrap.

Notes

References

External links
  NavSource Online: AK-85 Nashira

 

Port repair ships of the United States Army
Enceladus-class cargo ships
Ships built in Camden, New Jersey
1944 ships
Type N3 ships of the United States Army
World War II auxiliary ships of the United States